Marylebone was a parliamentary constituency centred on the Marylebone district of Central London.  It returned one Member of Parliament (MP) to the House of Commons of the Parliament of the United Kingdom.

It was created for the 1918 general election, and abolished for the 1983 general election.

Boundaries

Statutory description

1918–1950: The Metropolitan Borough of St Marylebone wards of Bryanston Square, Cavendish, Church Street, Dorset Square and Regent's Park, Hamilton Terrace, Langham, Park Crescent, Portman, and St John's Wood Terrace.

1950–1974: The Metropolitan Borough of St Marylebone wards of Bell Street, Bryanston Square, Cavendish Square, Church Street, Dorset Square, Hamilton Terrace, Lord's, Park Crescent, Portman Square, and St John's Wood Terrace.

1974–1983: The City of Westminster wards of Baker Street, Cavendish, Church Street, Lord's, and Regent's Park.

No substantive change
As shown by the maps, inset, there was no change in substance to the outer ward boundaries of this constituency during its lifetime.

Members of Parliament

Elections

Elections in the 1910s

Elections in the 1920s

Elections in the 1930s

Elections in the 1940s 
General Election 1939–40

Another General Election was required to take place before the end of 1940. The political parties had been making preparations for an election to take place and by the Autumn of 1939, the following candidates had been selected; 
Conservative: Alec Cunningham-Reid
Labour: Elizabeth Jacobs

Elections in the 1950s

Elections in the 1960s

Elections in the 1970s

References

Parliamentary constituencies in London (historic)
Constituencies of the Parliament of the United Kingdom established in 1918
Constituencies of the Parliament of the United Kingdom disestablished in 1974
Politics of the City of Westminster